The women's 3000 metres walk event  at the 1992 European Athletics Indoor Championships was held in Palasport di Genova on 28 February and 29 February.

Medalists

Results

Heats
First 4 from each heat (Q) and the next 4 fastest (q) qualified for the final.

Final

References

Racewalking at the European Athletics Indoor Championships
Walk
1992 in women's athletics